The 1992 Italian Open was a tennis tournament played on outdoor clay courts. It was the 49th edition of the Italian Open, and was part of the ATP Super 9 of the 1992 ATP Tour, and of the Tier I Series of the 1992 WTA Tour. Both the men's and the women's events took place at the Foro Italico in Rome, Italy. The women's tournament was played from 4 May until 10 May 1992, and the men's tournament was played from 11 May until 18 May 1992.

Finals

Men's singles

 Jim Courier defeated  Carlos Costa, 7–6(7–3) 6–0, 6–4
It was Jim Courier's 5th title of the year and his 28th overall. It was his 2nd Masters title of the year and his 4th overall.

Women's singles

 Gabriela Sabatini defeated  Monica Seles 7–5, 6–4
It was Gabriela Sabatini's 5th title of the year and her 25th overall. It was her 2nd Tier I title of the year and her 6th overall. It was also her 3rd win and 2nd consecutive title at the event, also winning in 1991 and 1988.

Men's doubles

 Jakob Hlasek /  Marc Rosset defeated  Wayne Ferreira /  Mark Kratzmann  6–4, 3–6, 6–1

Women's doubles

 Monica Seles /  Helena Suková defeated  Katerina Maleeva /  Barbara Rittner 6–1, 6–2

References

External links
Official website

 
Italian Open
Italian Open
Italian Open (tennis)
Italian Open